Aily is a village in Varanasi district in the Indian state of Uttar Pradesh.

Demography
Aily has a total population of 1,693 people amongst 285 families. Sex ratio of Akhari is 950 and child sex ratio is 827. Uttar Pradesh state average for both ratios is 912 and 902 respectively.

Transportation
Aily can be accessed by road and by Indian Railways.

See also

References

Villages in Varanasi district